Jereh and Baladeh District is a district (bakhsh) in Kazerun County, Fars Province, Iran. At the 2016 census, its population was 35,524, in 9,967 families.  The District has one city: Baladeh. The District has three rural districts (dehestan): Dadin Rural District, Famur Rural District, and Jereh Rural District.

References 

Kazerun County
Districts of Fars Province